In group theory, a Dedekind group is a group G such that every subgroup of G is normal.
All abelian groups are Dedekind groups.
A non-abelian Dedekind group is called a Hamiltonian group.

The most familiar (and smallest) example of a Hamiltonian group is the quaternion group of order 8, denoted by Q8.
Dedekind and Baer have shown (in the finite and respectively infinite order case) that every Hamiltonian group is a direct product of the form , where B is an elementary abelian 2-group, and D is a torsion abelian group with all elements of odd order.

He named the non-abelian ones after William Rowan Hamilton, the discoverer of quaternions.

In 1898 George Miller delineated the structure of a Hamiltonian group in terms of its order and that of its subgroups. For instance, he shows "a Hamilton group of order 2a has  quaternion groups as subgroups". In 2005 Horvat et al used this structure to count the number of Hamiltonian groups of any order  where o is an odd integer. When  then there are no Hamiltonian groups of order n, otherwise there are the same number as there are Abelian groups of order o.

Notes

References 
 .
 Baer, R. Situation der Untergruppen und Struktur der Gruppe, Sitz.-Ber. Heidelberg. Akad. Wiss.2, 12–17, 1933.
 .
 .
.
.

Group theory
Properties of groups